is a subway station on the  Fukuoka City Subway Nanakuma Line in Nishi-ku, Fukuoka in Japan. Its station symbol is a picture of maple leaves  in front of an orange mountain, because there used to be Momiji-Hachimangu().

Lines

Platforms

Vicinity
Route 202
Deodeo
Nanakuma Line train depot
Suga Shrine
Hashimoto Park
Nishitetsu bus station

History
February 3, 2005: Opening of the station

References

Railway stations in Japan opened in 2005
Railway stations in Fukuoka Prefecture
Nanakuma Line